Bayard is a magic bay horse in the legends derived from the medieval chansons de geste. These texts, especially that of The Four Sons of Aymon, attribute to him magical qualities and a supernatural origin. He is known for his strength and intelligence, and possesses the supernatural ability to adjust his size to his riders.

Since the Middle Ages, Bayard has been an important figure in northern French and Belgian folklore, particularly in the Ardennes, notably in Bogny-sur-Meuse, Dinant, Namur and Dendermonde. Folk processions stage it among the processional giants, namely the Ducasse d'Ath and the Ommegang van Dendermonde. The widespread dissemination of his legend and its success have influenced many artists, as well as popular beliefs.

Legend
Bayard first appears as the property of Renaud de Montauban (Italian: Rinaldo) in the Old French twelfth century chanson de geste The Four Sons of Aymon.  The horse was capable of carrying Rinaldo and his three brothers ("the four sons of Aymon") all at the same time and of understanding human speech.  Near the end of the work, Renaud is forced to cede Bayard to Charlemagne who, as punishment for the horse's exploits, has a large stone tied to Bayard's neck and has the horse pushed into the river; Bayard however smashes the stone with his hooves and escapes to live forever more in the woods.

In subsequent chansons de geste, Bayard was said to have been initially won by Renaud's cousin, the magician Maugris, before being given to Renaud.

In Bulfinch's Mythology, Rinaldo's acquisition of Bayard is described as follows: a disguised Maugris (who had previously acquired Bayard) tells Rinaldo that a wild horse under an enchantment roams the woods, and that this horse belonged initially to Amadis of Gaul and can only be won by a knight of Amadis' lineage.  Rinaldo eventually subdues the horse by throwing it on the ground, breaking the enchantment.  

Bayard also appears in the epic poems on chivalrous subjects by Luigi Pulci, Matteo Maria Boiardo and Ludovico Ariosto.

Bayard, by the late 13th century, also acquired common usage as a name for any bay-coloured horse (reddish-brown coat with black mane and tail) and lost some of his lustre as a magic heroic horse. The name "Bayard" became associated in English literature with a clownish, blind and foolish horse.  

Chaucer first used "Bayard" in a simile in the epic poem Troilus and Criseyde.  As Troilus has been scorning the power of love before seeing Criseyde and falling in love himself, so Bayard, proudly skipping "out of the wey" while he pranced, had to admit "Yet am I but an hors".  Chaucer also used "Bayard" in The Canterbury Tales (c. 1286) to denote a randy stud in "The Reeve's Tale" and a blind, foolish horse in "The Canon's Yeoman's Tale": "Though ye prolle ay, ye shul it nevere fynde. Ye been as boold as is Bayard the blynde.  That blondreth forth and peril casteth noon." ("Though you search afar, you shall never find it; Be you as bold as Bayard the blind, that blunders forth and perceives no peril.")

Local
Outside the Walloon town of Dinant in Belgium stands "Bayard Rock", a large cleft rock formation that was said to have been split by Bayard's mighty hooves. In Namur, the next town downriver along the Meuse, stands a locally famous statue of Bayard and the Four Aymon Brothers. There are plenty of named places in Wallonia linked to the legend of the Four Aymon Brothers and Bayard.

The Bayard legend is also celebrated in other towns in Belgium — most notably in the Flemish town of Dendermonde, where a large procession is organised every ten years. The rivalry between Dendermonde and Aalst, a city close by, has led to the construction of the Steed Balatum by the inhabitants of Aalst, as a parody on Bayard. Brussels (as part of the Ommegang), Lier, Mechelen and Ath all organise processions that include Bayard. There are also Bayard statues in Ghent and Grembergen.

A similar magical horse named "Blind Byard" is part of Lincolnshire folklore at Byard's Leap.

See also
List of fictional horses
Veillantif – Roland/Orlando's horse (also called Brigliadoro)
Marshal Ney – often used as a nickname
Ros Beiaard – Flemish folkloristic procession in Dendermonde

References

Notations
 Chanson de Renaud de Montauban
 Orlando innamorato by Matteo Maria Boiardo
 Orlando furioso by Ludovico Ariosto

French
Hasenohr, Geneviève and Michel Zink, eds.  Dictionnaire des lettres françaises: Le Moyen Age.  Collection: La Pochothèque.  Paris: Fayard, 1992. 
Les Quatre Fils Aymon ou Renaud de Montauban  Presentation, selection and translation in modern French by Micheline de Combarieu du Grès and Jean Subrenat. Paris: Gallimard, 1983.

Footnotes

French folklore
Belgian folklore
Matter of France
Horses in mythology
Walloon culture
Medieval legends
Belgian legends
French legends